Rabbi David Bigman (born 1953) is a Modern Orthodox Rabbi. Bigman is the head of Yeshivat Ma'ale Gilboa along with Rabbis Yehuda Gilad and Shmuel Reiner. He helped found the Ein Hanatziv Midrasha for girls and used to head the Ein Tzurim Yeshiva. Bigman developed the Revadim (“layers “) technique for the study of Talmud, combining traditional learning methods with academic research tools.

Biography 
Bigman was born in Detroit, Michigan. He studied under Rabbi Ahron Soloveichik at the Hebrew Theological College, better known as the Skokie Yeshiva, and then under Rabbi Aryeh Leib Bakst. After moving to Israel he studied at the Netzach Israel, Kerem B'Yavneh and Merkaz HaRav yeshiva programs. He received his Rabbinic ordination from the Ariel Institute in Haifa.

Bigman completed his B.A. in Economics with honors at Wayne State University. He moved to Israel in 1976, served in the Israel Defense Forces (IDF), and joined Ma'ale Gilboa, of the Religious Kibbutz Movement.

Bigman served as the rabbi of Kibbutz Ma'ale Gilboa between 1982 and 1986. From 1986 to 1993 he was the head of the Ein Tzurim Yeshiva, and has been at the head of Yeshivat Ma'ale Gilboa since it opened in 1993. Bigman was also active in opening the Ein HaNatziv program for girls.

Over the years Bigman taught in many places, in Israel and the United States, including the Pardes Institute of Jewish Studies, the Drisha Institute and Yeshivat Hadar. In 2012 Bigman joined Beit Hillel, a group of Modern Orthodox Israeli rabbis working to create a more engaged spiritual leadership.

Teachings and legacy 
Bigman believes Torah study must be done out of sense of commitment to the teachings and traditions of Halakha (Jewish rabbinical law), but also through listening to current voices and ideas. This approach is evident in his Talmudic teaching technique, which seeks to understand the diversity of the Talmud's voices based on its sources and layers.

Bigman is known for his involvement in issues of social justice, such as work for married women who are Agunot and 'chained' to their marriage and for women who are refused a Get - the Jewish divorce document - by their husbands. In this capacity, he currently serves as the Av Beit Din (Chief Justice) of the International Beit Din, where advanced legal techniques and solutions are employed to free women who are agunot. He has also issued lenient religious rulings regarding the singing of women. In addition to his rabbinic work, Bigman has been involved in groups promoting social justice. He is considered to be among the more Liberal-minded Modern Orthodox rabbis in Israel, is involved in inter-faith dialogue groups and sits on the board of the Elijah Interfaith Institute.

Books 
The Fire and the Cloud. Contemporary Reflections on the Weekly Torah Reading, the Gefen Publishing Company, 2011.

Additional reading 
 Rabbi Bigman's Zionism: Admiration and Reservation, Ross Singer, on The Times of Israel

References

External links 
 David Bigman's articles on Yeshivat Ma'ale Gilboa
 David Bigman's podcasts  on Torah in Motion
 David Bigman's articles on Jewish Ideas

1954 births
Mercaz HaRav alumni
Religious Zionist rosh yeshivas
American Modern Orthodox Jews
Living people
Israeli Modern Orthodox Jews